Mount Bibele is a large mountain in the Apennine mountains which acts as a drainage basin between the basins of the Idice river to the east and the Zena river to the west. Its highest point is 617 meters above sea level. The mountain is located in the commune of Monterenzio.

Etymology 
The toponym Bibele likely derives from the Latin verb bibo which means to drink. Medieval documents describe a mountain with the name Monte Bibulo.

Geography 
The mountain is made of sandstones, biocalcarenite, and marls from the Miocene epoch of the Neogene geologic period. The mountain has three peaks. Mount Bibele is the highest and is 617 meters high. It is the origin of the name of the mountain. The other peaks are Mount Tamburino, which is 575 meters high, and Mount Savino, which is 550 meters high.

History 

This region was likely settled by humans due to its naturally fortified position that allows for a view of the Raticosa pass and access to the Po valley. This site provided an economic benefit as it was on a trade route between the Etruscan civilization and central Italy.

Archaeological evidence has revealed that it was inhabited as early as the Copper Age. The necropolis found at the site dates back to the 3rd and 4th century BCE. It belonged to the La Tène culture, the Etruscan civilization, and the Celts. The oldest tombs in the cemetery date from 450 to 350 BCE and likely belong to the Etruscan civilization. Tombs dating back to the later parts of the 4th century BCE have Celtic artifacts. The necropolis is the largest Celtic cemetery found in Italy. 171 tombs have are located at the site. 123 of these are inhumations and 38 are cremations. Excavations at the cemetery began in 1980. Alongside this, numerous ceramics and bronze statuettes have been found.

References

External links 

 L'area archeologico-naturalistica di Monte Bibele L'area archeologico-naturalistica di Monte Bibele
 http://exarc.net/venues/archaeological-park-monte-bibele-it Monterenzio Archaeological Museum and Monte Bibele (IT) | EXARC Archaeological Park of Monte Bibele (IT) | EXARC

Mountains of Italy
Mountains of Emilia-Romagna